Instinct is the debut studio album released by the Stockholm-based band Niki & The Dove on August 7, 2012, by TEN Music Group, Sub Pop, and Mercury Records. It is their second release on US label Sub Pop.

Track listing

On some versions of the album, "Under the Bridges" has an extended drum ending.

Credits
Credits for Instinct adapted from AllMusic.
Adis Adamsson - A&R
Malin Dahlstrom - Art Direction, Composer, Design, Producer
Björn Engelmann - Mastering
Eliot Hazel - Photography
Anders Hvenare - Mixing
Gustaf Karlof - Art Direction, Composer, Design, Producer
Ted Krotkiewski - Mixing
Elof Loelv - Composer, Producer
Mat Maitland - Art Direction, Design, Digital Imagery
Lasse Mårtén - Mixing
Jamie Nelson - A&R
Niki & The Dove - Primary Artist

References

External links
Instinct on Sub Pop 
Niki & The Dove on Sub Pop

2012 debut albums
Niki and the Dove albums
TEN Music Group albums
Sub Pop albums
European Border Breakers Award-winning albums